The 2008 Survivor Series was the 22nd annual Survivor Series professional wrestling pay-per-view (PPV) event produced by World Wrestling Entertainment (WWE). It was held for wrestlers from the promotion's Raw, SmackDown, and ECW brand divisions. The event took place on November 23, 2008, at the TD Banknorth Garden in Boston, Massachusetts. This is the second event to take place in Boston, the first one since 1993. The event's card consisted of six professional wrestling matches. The event received 319,000 pay-per-view buys, less than the previous year's event. It was also the first Survivor Series PPV broadcast in high definition.

The main event was for the World Heavyweight Championship between John Cena, returning after suffering a herniated disc at SummerSlam, and the champion, Chris Jericho, which Cena won by pinfall after executing a FU. Another match on the event was the SmackDown main event, which saw Edge return and defeat Vladimir Kozlov, and the champion Triple H, in a Triple Threat match to win the WWE Championship. The undercard matches included The Undertaker versus The Big Show in a Casket Match and three five-on-five elimination tag team matches.

Production

Background
Survivor Series is an annual gimmick pay-per-view (PPV), produced every November by World Wrestling Entertainment (WWE) since 1987. In what has become the second longest running pay-per-view event in history (behind WWE's WrestleMania), it is one of the promotion's original four pay-per-views, along with WrestleMania, Royal Rumble, and SummerSlam, referred to as the "Big Four". The event is traditionally characterized by having Survivor Series matches, which are tag team elimination matches that typically pits teams of four or five wrestlers against each other. The 2008 event was the 22nd event in the Survivor Series chronology and featured wrestlers from the Raw, SmackDown, and ECW brands. The event was scheduled to be held on November 23, 2008, at the TD Banknorth Garden in Boston, Massachusetts. It was the first Survivor Series PPV broadcast in high definition.

Storylines
The event featured professional wrestling matches involving wrestlers from pre-existing scripted feuds, plots and storylines. Wrestlers portrayed heroes or villains as they followed a series of events that built tension, and culminated into a wrestling match or series of matches. Storylines were produced on WWE's weekly television shows, Raw, SmackDown, and ECW.

Advertising on WWE programming and on the Survivor Series promotional poster had foreshadowed the return of John Cena, whom a herniated disk injury (that he suffered during his match with Batista at SummerSlam) had sidelined, at the event. On the November 3, 2008 episode of Raw, Shane McMahon announced that Cena would challenge for the World Heavyweight Championship at Survivor Series. Cena would face the champion resulting from a Steel cage match between World Heavyweight Champion Batista and Chris Jericho, which Jericho won to become the new World Heavyweight Champion, setting up his match with Cena at Survivor Series.

The main feud on the SmackDown brand involved Triple H, Vladimir Kozlov and Jeff Hardy, who were competing for Triple H's WWE Championship. At No Mercy in October, Hardy came close to winning the WWE title from Triple H but failed to do so when Triple H pinned him with the roll-up. Kozlov was one of the choices for Triple H's challengers at Cyber Sunday for the fans to vote, but Hardy won the poll and faced Triple H for the title, a match in which Hardy lost again. Then, after Kozlov demanded a WWE title match against Triple H on SmackDown, General manager Vickie Guerrero put Kozlov in a match against The Undertaker on the November 7 episode of SmackDown, adding that if Kozlov won, he would challenge Triple H at Survivor Series for the WWE Championship. Kozlov won the match, albeit via disqualification after Hardy interfered and hit Kozlov with a steel chair. However, after seeing Hardy defeat The Undertaker in an Extreme Rules match the following week, Guerrero scheduled Hardy in a non-title match against Triple H on the November 21 episode of SmackDown, stating that should Hardy win, she would add him to the WWE Championship match at Survivor Series, making it a Triple Threat match. Hardy won the match and earned the title opportunity. However, it was announced during the event that Hardy was found unconscious in a hotel stairwell in Boston, casting doubt over whether he would be able to compete in the match.

Another feud from SmackDown heading into Survivor Series took place between The Undertaker and The Big Show. At Unforgiven, Big Show betrayed The Undertaker and attacked him, punching him in the head on several occasions. At No Mercy, in a match between the two, Big Show knocked The Undertaker out with 2 punches to the face and 1 to the back of the head, prompting the referee to rule the match a knockout in Big Show's favour. However, at Cyber Sunday, when the fans voted for a Last Man Standing match, Undertaker defeated Big Show by choking him out with the Hell's Gate. On an episode of SmackDown, The Undertaker defeated Chavo Guerrero in a casket match despite the Big Show's interference. On the November 7 episode, Big Show challenged Undertaker to a casket match at Survivor Series.

Three inter-promotional Survivor Series Elimination matches were scheduled for the event. In one match, Shawn Michaels captained the team of Rey Mysterio, The Great Khali, and Cryme Tyme (JTG and Shad Gaspard) against John "Bradshaw" Layfield (JBL) and his team of Montel Vontavious Porter (MVP), Kane, John Morrison and The Miz. The feud that led to the Team HBK vs. Team JBL match began between Rey Mysterio and Kane over the summer then a couple of months later, the Team of Cryme Tyme (from the Raw brand) started their own feud against John Morrison and The Miz (from the ECW brand). From SmackDown, MVP and The Great Khali have had their own issues in the few weeks leading up to Survivor Series. The main rivalry between the captains, Michaels and JBL, began on the October 27 episode of Raw, when JBL attacked Michaels before a tag-team match between the latter and Batista, taking on JBL and Chris Jericho. Despite of the assault, Michaels and Batista defeated JBL and Jericho. The next week, a match between JBL and The Undertaker took place, which Undertaker won by countout. Moments after the match, Michaels threw JBL back into the ring, allowing Undertaker to perform a Tombstone Piledriver on JBL. On the November 10 episode, JBL retaliated when he helped Chris Jericho defeat Michaels in a Last Man Standing match.

Another match featured Batista captaining the team of Matt Hardy, R-Truth, CM Punk, and Kofi Kingston, and facing off against the team captained by Randy Orton, consisting of Shelton Benjamin, William Regal, Cody Rhodes, and Mark Henry. The rivalry between the captains, Batista and Orton began on the November 10 episode of Raw, when Batista invoked his rematch clause against Chris Jericho, whom he lost the World title the week before in a Steel cage match. Stephanie McMahon, however, appeared in the titantron to address Batista, alerting him that due to her brother, Shane's promise that whoever won the Steel cage match would go on to face John Cena for the title at Survivor Series, she was unable to grant Batista his rematch request until after the pay-per-view event. Following this, Orton made his way to the ring, dredging up bad history from he and Batista's days in Evolution several years earlier. Orton then said that after Cena, it was his turn for a title opportunity, not Batista's. On the November 17 episode of Raw, Orton defeated Punk in a Lumberjack match with the help of then WWE Intercontinental Champion, William Regal. After the match, Batista entered the ring and attacked Orton, leading all of the superstars present to get involved in what became an out-of-control brawl that ended the show.

The third match announced was a Divas Elimination match, in which Beth Phoenix led Team Raw composed of Mickie James, Candice Michelle, Kelly Kelly, and Jillian Hall, against Team SmackDown, which featured Michelle McCool as captain, Victoria, Maria, Maryse, and Natalya. On the October 3 episode of SmackDown, Women's Champion Phoenix defeated the Divas Champion McCool in a Lumberjill match due to interference from Maryse. The feud between Phoenix and McCool restarted on the November 17 episode of Raw, when Raw Diva, Kelly Kelly fought SmackDown Diva Victoria and was victorious. As a result of this, Victoria attacked her opponent after the bell before Kelly's fellow Raw Divas ran to her rescue.

Event

Before Survivor Series aired on pay-per-view, The Brian Kendrick defeated Kung Fu Naki in an untelevised match.

Preliminary matches 
The actual pay-per-view opened with a Survivor Series elimination match between Team HBK (Shawn Michaels, Rey Mysterio, Cryme Tyme (Shad Gaspard and JTG) and The Great Khali) and Team JBL (John "Bradshaw" Layfield (JBL), Kane, Montel Vontavious Porter (MVP), John Morrison and The Miz). 7 minutes into the match; the first four eliminations of JTG, MVP, Kane and Gaspard took place. JBL, The Miz and Morrison dominated Michaels where JBL bruised Michaels' eye. Morrison taunted Michaels using the latter's techniques but couldnt execute them properly . Michaels made a desperate tag to Rey Mysterio who after a flurry of offense connected with "619" and a splash on Miz and eliminated him. Later on, JBL and Morrison dominated Rey Mysterio who after a Moonsault on JBL tagged in Michaels. Michaels and JBL took the fight outside the ring and Michaels made it before the 10-count. JBL was eliminated via countout. Morrison tried to do the  Sweet Chin Music on Michaels but Michaels countered with one of his own to eliminate Morrison and bring the victory to his team. Khali, Mysterio and Michaels were the survivors.

The second match was a Divas Survivor Series elimination match between Team Raw (Beth Phoenix, Mickie James, Kelly Kelly, Candice Michelle and Jillian Hall) and Team SmackDown (Michelle McCool, Victoria, Maria, Maryse and Natalya). Victoria was eliminated by Kelly Kelly with a Rana pin. Kelly Kelly was eliminated by Maryse after a Side Slam Backbreaker. McCool was eliminated by Mickie after a Mickie-DDT. James was eliminated by Maryse with a roll-up. Natalya was eliminated by Candice after a Spear. Hall was eliminated by Maria with a victory roll. Maria was eliminated by Candice with a Bridging Northern Light Suplex pin. Candice was eliminated by Maryse after submitting to a modified Figure Four Leglock. Maryse was eliminated by Phoenix after a Glam Slam, leaving Phoenix as the sole survivor.

Next, The Undertaker faced Big Show in a Casket Match. During the match, Undertaker executed a Leg Drop through a broadcast table on Big Show. Big Show performed a Chokeslam on Undertaker and tried to walk away but Undertaker stopped him. The two fought on the entrance ramp, where Big Show set up the casket. The match ended when Undertaker performed an Irish Whip on Big Show, knocking him into a casket. As the casket fell over, Undertaker won the match.

The fourth match was a Survivor Series elimination match between Team Orton (Randy Orton, Shelton Benjamin, William Regal, Cody Rhodes and Mark Henry) and Team Batista (Batista, CM Punk, Kofi Kingston, Matt Hardy, and R-Truth). Regal was eliminated by Punk after a GTS. R-Truth was eliminated by Benjamin after a Paydirt. Kingston was eliminated by Orton after a Rope-Hung DDT. Punk was eliminated by Rhodes after a Silver Spoon DDT. Hardy was eliminated by Henry after a World's Strongest Slam. Henry was eliminated by Batista after a Spear. Benjamin was eliminated by Batista after a Batista Bomb. Batista was eliminated by Orton after an RKO, leaving Orton and Rhodes as the survivors.

Main event matches
The first main event match began as a standard match for the WWE Championship between Triple H and Vladimir Kozlov. After Triple H executed a Pedigree on Kozlov, Vickie Guerrero changed the match into a Triple threat match also involving Edge, marking Edge's first appearance since SummerSlam. Edge performed a Spear on Triple H but was attacked by Jeff Hardy, who was originally scheduled to be in the match. Hardy tried to hit Edge with a chair but hit Triple H instead. Hardy then also hit Kozlov with the chair but Edge performed a Spear on Hardy. Edge pinned Triple H to win the title. This was the first time that the WWE Championship changed hands in the PG Era.

In the final match, Chris Jericho defended the World Heavyweight Championship against John Cena, who returned from injury after suffering a herniated disc at SummerSlam. During the match, Cena attempted a Five Knuckle Shuffle on Jericho but Jericho applied the Liontamer on Cena, which he countered. Jericho applied the Walls of Jericho but Cena reached the ropes to break the hold. Cena performed an FU on Jericho for a near-fall. Cena attempted another FU on Jericho but Jericho countered with a Codebreaker for a near-fall. Cena applied the STF on Jericho but Jericho countered with a small package for a near-fall. Cena performed another FU on Jericho to win the title. This was the third time that the World Heavyweight Championship changed hands in the PG Era, even though the title re-entered a Ruthless Aggression rivalry following Unforgiven, in which Chris Jericho  and Shawn Michaels had a heated rivalry which dated back to Judgment Day, and continued until November 10, 2008 in a last man standing match. Following SummerSlam, this was the only Ruthless Aggression rivalry taking place in WWE.

Reception
The event was voted by Wrestling Observer Newsletter as the worst pay-per-view of 2008; Jeff Hardy's hotel room unconsciousness, used as the kayfabe reason for his removal from the WWE Championship match was also voted as that year's Most Disgusting Promotional Tactic.

The event received 319,000 pay per view buys, down from 341,000 the previous year, which contributed to a decline of $4 million in pay-per-view revenue for WWE in the fourth quarter of 2008.

Aftermath
After Edge returned and captured the WWE Championship, Triple H, Jeff Hardy, and Vladimir Kozlov participated in a Beat The Clock challenge for the number one contender's spot. Kozlov lost his match to Matt Hardy, while Jeff Hardy and Triple H each won their matches in exactly the same time. Due to the results, a reluctant Vickie Guerrero scheduled Edge to defend his WWE Championship against both Hardy and Triple H in a triple threat match at Armageddon. At the pay-per-view, Hardy defeated Edge and Triple H to win his first WWE Championship. The situation with Jeff Hardy was tied into the lead up to his match at WrestleMania 25 against his brother Matt Hardy, who claimed responsibility for attacking him.

The feud between John Cena and Chris Jericho continued on into Armageddon, where Cena defeated Jericho to retain the World Heavyweight Championship.

The day after Survivor Series, Melina returned from injury and resumed her feud with Beth Phoenix that had begun back in June. On the December 29 episode of Raw, Melina won a battle royal to become the number one contender to Phoenix's WWE Women's Championship. At the Royal Rumble, Melina defeated Phoenix to win her third Women's Championship. After the SmackDown Divas were defeated at Survivor Series, Michelle McCool began turning heel when she attacked Maria after losing a non-title match to her on the December 5 episode of SmackDown. Two weeks later, Maryse defeated Maria to earn a shot at Michelle's WWE Divas Championship. On the December 26 episode of SmackDown, Maryse defeated Michelle to capture the Divas Championship in a match where Maria was the guest referee.

Results

Survivor Series elimination matches

References

External links
Official Survivor Series website

2008 in Boston
Events in Boston
2008
Professional wrestling in Boston
2008 WWE pay-per-view events
November 2008 events in the United States